Lycodinae is a subfamily of marine ray-finned fish belonging to the family Zoarcidae, the eelpouts. These eelpouts are found are in all the world's oceans, with a number of species being found off southern South America.

Taxonomy
Lycodinae was first proposed as a taxonomic grouping in 1861 by the American zoologist Theodore Gill. The subfamily is classified within the eelpout family, Zoarcidae part of the suborder Zoarcoidei within the order Scorpaeniformes. The name of the subfamily derives from its type genus, Lycodes, which means "wolf-like" and refers to the then presumed close relationship of that taxon to the wolffish.

Genera
Lycodinae contains the following genera:

Characteristics
Lycodinae eelpouts have elongate heads and bodies, they have between 58 and 144 vertebrae. The branchiostegal membranes are typically attached to the isthmus, although not in Lycodapus. Most have a wide bill slit but some in some species it is more restricted. The do not usually possess a pore between the eyes. They’re between 4 and 9 suborbital bones, Typically, from 6 to 8, and these create an L-shaped pattern around the eyes. There are between 6 and 12 fin rays in the caudal fin. They have no spines in their fins, although in a few species there are pelvic fin rays which are fused into a pelvic splint.

Distribution
Lycodinae eelpouts are found throughout the world with a notable radiation in the littoral to upper continental slope off southern South America.

References

Zoarcidae
 
Taxa named by Theodore Gill
Taxa described in 1861
Ray-finned fish subfamilies